Mequinol, MeHQ or 4-methoxyphenol, is a phenol used in dermatology and organic chemistry.

Uses

Dermatology
Mequinol is a common active ingredient in topical drugs used for skin depigmentation. As a topical drug mequinol is often mixed with tretinoin, a topical retinoid. A common formulation for this drug is an ethanolic solution of 2% mequinol and 0.01% tretinoin by mass. Dermatologists commonly prescribe the drug to treat liver spots.

Lower dosages of mequinol have been used in conjunction with a Q-switched laser to depigment skin in patients with disseminated idiopathic vitiligo.

Organic chemistry
In organic chemistry 4-methoxyphenol is used as a polymerisation inhibitor (e.g. acrylates or styrene monomers).

Preparation
4-Methoxyphenol is produced from p-benzoquinone and methanol via a free radical reaction.

Safety 
People can be exposed to 4-methoxyphenol in the workplace by breathing it in, skin absorption, swallowing it, skin contact, and eye contact. The National Institute for Occupational Safety and Health (NIOSH) has set a recommended exposure limit (REL) of 5 mg/m3 over an 8-hour workday.

See also 
Monobenzone (benzyloxyphenol)
Hydroquinone
Guaiacol
2-Hydroxy-5-methoxybenzaldehyde

References

External links 
 

Phenols
Phenol ethers